Mauricio González (born October 16, 1960) is a Mexican retired long-distance runner. He won the gold medal in the men's 5000 metres event at the 1986 Central American and Caribbean Games, and competed for his native country at the 1988 Summer Olympics in Seoul, South Korea. Mexican record holder 5000m and 10000m 1985–1988. Fourth place Final Grand Prix 5000m Rome Italy.

González was married to Poland's long-distance runner Wanda Panfil.

Personal bests
5,000 metres — 13.22.4 (1985)
10,000 metres — 27.43.64 (1988)

External links

1960 births
Living people
Mexican male long-distance runners
Athletes (track and field) at the 1987 Pan American Games
Athletes (track and field) at the 1988 Summer Olympics
Olympic athletes of Mexico
Central American and Caribbean Games gold medalists for Mexico
Competitors at the 1986 Central American and Caribbean Games
Central American and Caribbean Games medalists in athletics
Pan American Games competitors for Mexico
20th-century Mexican people